Jasper, an aggregate of microgranular quartz and/or cryptocrystalline chalcedony and other mineral phases, is an opaque, impure variety of silica, usually red, yellow, brown or green in color; and rarely blue. The common red color is due to iron(III) inclusions. Jasper breaks with a smooth surface and is used for ornamentation or as a gemstone. It can be highly polished and is used for items such as vases, seals, and snuff boxes. The specific gravity of jasper is typically 2.5 to 2.9. Jaspillite is a banded-iron-formation rock that often has distinctive bands of jasper.

Etymology and history

The name means "spotted or speckled stone," and is derived via Old French jaspre (variant of Anglo-Norman jaspe) and Latin iaspidem (nom. iaspis) from Greek ἴασπις iaspis (feminine noun), from an Afroasiatic language (cf. Hebrew ישפה yashpeh, Akkadian yashupu). This Semitic  etymology is believed to be unrelated to that of the English given name Jasper, which is of Persian origin, though the Persian word for the mineral jasper is also yashp (یَشم).

Green jasper was used to make bow drills in Mehrgarh between 4th and 5th millennium BC. Jasper is known to have been a favorite gem in the ancient world; its name can be traced back in Arabic, Persian, Hebrew, Assyrian, Greek and Latin. On Minoan Crete, jasper was carved to produce seals circa 1800 BC, as evidenced by archaeological recoveries at the palace of Knossos.

Although the term jasper is now restricted to opaque quartz, the ancient iaspis was a stone of considerable translucency including nephrite. The jasper of antiquity was in many cases distinctly green, for it is often compared to emerald and other green objects. Jasper is referred to in the Nibelungenlied as being clear and green. The jasper of the ancients probably included stones which would now be classed as chalcedony, and the emerald-like jasper may have been akin to the modern chrysoprase. The Hebrew word may have designated a green jasper. Flinders Petrie suggested that the odem, the first stone on the High Priest's breastplate, was a red jasper, whilst tarshish, the tenth stone, may have been a yellow jasper.

Types

Jasper is an opaque rock of virtually any colour stemming from the mineral content of the original sediments or ash.  Patterns arise during the consolidation process forming flow and depositional patterns in the original silica-rich sediment or volcanic ash. Hydrothermal circulation is generally thought to be required in the formation of jasper.

Jasper can be modified by the diffusion of minerals along discontinuities providing the appearance of vegetative growth, i.e., dendritic. The original materials are often fractured and/or distorted, after deposition, into diverse patterns, which are later filled in with other colorful minerals. Weathering, with time, will create intensely colored superficial rinds.

The classification and naming of jasper varieties presents a challenge. Terms attributed to various well-defined materials includes the geographic locality where it is found, sometimes quite restricted such as "Bruneau" (a canyon) and "Lahontan" (a lake), rivers and even individual mountains; many are fanciful, such as "forest fire" or "rainbow", while others are descriptive, such as "autumn" or "porcelain". A few are designated by the place of origin such as a brown Egyptian or red African.

Banded iron formations 
Jasper is the main component in the silica-rich parts of banded iron formations (BIFs) which indicate low, but present, amounts of dissolved oxygen in the water such as during the Great Oxidation Event or snowball earths.  The red bands, typically more competent than the hematite layers surrounding it, are made of microcrystalline red chert, also called jasper.

Picture jaspers

Picture jaspers exhibit combinations of patterns resulting in what appear to be scenes or images, when seen on a cut section. Such patterns include banding from flow or depositional patterns (from water or wind), as well as dendritic or color variations. Diffusion from a center produces a distinctive orbicular appearance, i.e., leopard skin jasper or linear banding from a fracture as seen in liesegang jasper. Healed, fragmented rock produces brecciated (broken) jasper.

While these "picture jaspers" can be found all over the world, specific colors or patterns are unique to the geographic region from which they originate. One source of the stone is Indonesia, especially in Purbalingga district. From the US, Oregon's Biggs jasper and Idaho's Bruneau jasper from the Bruneau River canyon are particularly fine examples. Other examples can be seen at Ynys Llanddwyn in Wales. A remarkable, pale, blue-green jasper, with patterns somewhat resembling those of malachite, occurs in a deposit at Ettutkan Mountain, Staryi Sibay, Bashkortostan, Russia. (The town of Sibay, in the far south of the Ural Mountains, near the border with Kazakhstan, is noted for its colossal, open-cast copper mine.)

Basanite and other types of touchstone
Basanite is a deep velvety-black variety of amorphous quartz, of a slightly tougher and finer grain than jasper, and less splintery than hornstone. It was the Lydian stone or touchstone of the ancients. It is mentioned and its use described in the writings of Bacchylides about 450 B.C., and was also described by Theophrastus in his book On Stones (Ancient Greek title: Περὶ λίθων: Peri Lithon), a century later. It is evident that the touchstone that Pliny had in mind when he wrote about it was merely a dense variety of basalt.

Basanite (not to be confused with bassanite), Lydian stone, and radiolarite (a.k.a. lydite or flinty slate) are terms used to refer to several types of black, jasper-like rock (also including tuffs, cherts and siltstones) which are dense, fine-grained and flinty / cherty in texture and found in a number of localities. The "Lydian Stone" known to the Ancient Greeks is named for the ancient kingdom of Lydia in what is now western Turkey. A similar rock type occurs in New England. Such rock types have long been used for the making of touchstones to test the purity of precious metal alloys, because they are hard enough to scratch such metals, which, if drawn (scraped) across them, show to advantage their metallic streaks of various (diagnostic) colours, against the dark background. There are, confusingly, not one but two rocks called basanite, one being a black form of jasper and the other a black volcanic rock closely akin to basalt. Add to this the fact that many different rock types - having in common the colour black and a fine texture - have, over the ages, been pressed into service as touchstones and it will be seen that there is ample scope for confusion in this petrology- and mineralogy-related field of study.

Gallery

References

External links